William Henton Carver (27 May 1868 – 28 January 1961) was a Conservative Party politician in the United Kingdom who served as a Member of Parliament (MP) for Howdenshire from 1926 to 1945.

He was first elected at a by-election in 1926, following the resignation of the Conservative MP Stanley Jackson to take up the post of Governor of Bengal.  Carver held the seat until he stood down at the 1945 general election.

A steam locomotive of the LNER Thompson Class B1 was named after him.

References

Sources

External links 

1868 births
1961 deaths
Conservative Party (UK) MPs for English constituencies
UK MPs 1924–1929
UK MPs 1929–1931
UK MPs 1931–1935
UK MPs 1935–1945